Absolom Madden West (1818 – September 30, 1894) was an American planter, Confederate militia general, state politician, railroad president and labor organizer. Born in Alabama, he became a plantation owner in Holmes County, Mississippi and President of the Mississippi Central Railroad. He served in the American Civil War. After the war, he served in the Mississippi State Senate and ran for Vice President of the United States, unsuccessfully.

Early life
Absolom Madden West was born in 1818 in Alabama. His father, Anderson West, was a county sheriff.

Career

West obtained Federal land grants in Mississippi and moved to Holmes County, Mississippi in 1837, where he became a planter. He won election to the Mississippi State Senate as a Whig in 1847. In 1853, he became an officer of the newly formed Mississippi Central Railroad.

Although initially an opponent of secession, when the American Civil War broke out, West became a brigadier general in the Mississippi State Militia. He raised a regiment, and later assumed various administrative offices for the state. Sometimes simultaneously, he served as quartermaster-general, paymaster-general, and commissary-general of the Mississippi militia. At his direction, the legislature established a commission consisting of one lawyer and two businessmen to examine and audit the books and papers of his several offices. At the end of the war, West was the only officer of the state to make a final accounting. After 1864, West also served as president of the Mississippi Central Railroad. After the war, the railroad was sold to the Illinois Central, and West was returned to the State Senate.

Soon thereafter, West was elected to the Federal House of Representatives although he, along with the rest of the unreconstructed Mississippi delegation, was not permitted to be seated. In the years that followed, West established a branch of the National Labor Union, and served as a Democratic elector for president in the election of 1876.

Re-elected to the State Senate, West soon became disenchanted with the Democrats, and joined the Greenback party. For that party and for the Anti-Monopoly Party, West was a candidate for vice president on the ticket of Benjamin Franklin Butler in 1884.

Personal life and death

West purchased Oakleigh, an Antebellum mansion in Holly Springs, Mississippi, from Judge Jeremiah W. Clapp in 1870. He died on September 30, 1894 in Holly Springs, and he was buried at the Hillcrest Cemetery.

References

1818 births
1894 deaths
19th-century American politicians
19th-century American railroad executives
Anti-Monopoly Party politicians
Burials at Hillcrest Cemetery
Confederate militia generals
Greenback Party vice presidential nominees
Mississippi Greenbacks
Mississippi Democrats
Mississippi state senators
Mississippi Whigs
People from Holly Springs, Mississippi
People of Mississippi in the American Civil War
1884 United States vice-presidential candidates
Military personnel from Alabama